Koinange wa Mbiyu (1865–1960) was a Kikuyu chief.

Koinange played a stifling role in Kenya's  fight for independence movement. He was a paramount chief who helped the Colonial powers to suppress Africans that were fighting for the independence.  He made his home available for meetings and was involved in providing support for the Mau Mau.

Although he never learnt to read or write, he was an articulate man, politically active and influential. He led  his clan from 1905, and was appointed “headman” by the Colonial administration in 1921, and Senior Chief of Kiambu District in 1938. By 1942 he was Senior Chief without location. He was then to become an adviser on African affairs to the District Commissioner who once described him as “the evil genius of Kiambu”.

He retired in February 1949 as Senior Chief but remained active retaining the role of African deputy vice-president of the Kiambu Local Native Council. However in 1952 he was detained by the colonial government for eight years, being released on July 1, 1960. by this time he was 95 years of age and was quite frail. He died 19 days later.

He had six wives and 34 children including Mbiyu Koinange.

References

1866 births
1960 deaths
People of the Mau Mau Uprising
Kikuyu people